Albion is an alternative name for Great Britain. The oldest attestation of the toponym comes from the Greek language. It is sometimes used poetically and generally to refer to the island, but is less common than 'Britain' today. The name for Scotland in most of the Celtic languages is related to Albion: Alba in Scottish Gaelic, Albain (genitive Alban) in Irish, Nalbin in Manx and Alban in Welsh and Cornish. These names were later Latinised as Albania and Anglicised as Albany, which were once alternative names for Scotland.

New Albion and Albionoria ("Albion of the North") were briefly suggested as names of Canada during the period of the Canadian Confederation. Sir Francis Drake gave the name New Albion to what is now California when he landed there in 1579.

Etymology

The name originally referred to Britain as a whole, but was later restricted to Caledonia (giving the modern Scottish Gaelic name for Scotland).

The root  is also found in Gaulish and Galatian  'world' and Welsh  (Old Welsh  'earth, world, land, country, district'). It may be related to other European and Mediterranean toponyms such as Alpes, Albania or the river god Alpheus (originally 'whitish'). It has two possible etymologies: either from the Proto-Indo-European word * 'white' (cf. Ancient Greek , Latin  ), or from *alb- 'hill'.

The derivation from a word for 'white' is thought to refer perhaps to the white Cliffs of Dover in the southeast, visible from mainland Europe and a landmark at the narrowest crossing point. On the other hand, Celtic linguist Xavier Delamarre argued that it originally meant 'the world above, the visible world', in opposition to 'the world below', i.e. the underworld.

Attestation

Judging from Avienius' Ora Maritima, for which it is considered to have served as a source, the Massaliote Periplus (originally written in the 6th century BC, translated by Avienus at the end of the 4th century AD), does not use the name Britannia; instead it speaks of nēsos Iernōn kai Albiōnōn "the islands of the Iernians and the Albiones". Likewise, Pytheas (c. 320 BC), as directly or indirectly quoted in the surviving excerpts of his works in later writers, speaks of Albiōn and Iernē (Britain and Ireland).

The name Albion was used by Isidore of Charax (1st century BC – 1st century AD) and subsequently by many classical writers. By the 1st century AD, the name refers unequivocally to Great Britain. But this "enigmatic name for Britain, revived much later by Romantic poets like William Blake, did not remain popular among Greek writers. From these words the Romans derived the Latin forms Britannia, Britannus, and Britannicus respectively".

The Pseudo-Aristotelian text On the Universe (393b) has:

 
Pliny the Elder, in his Natural History (4.16.102) likewise has:

In his 2nd century Geography, Ptolemy uses the name  (Alouiōn, "Albion") instead of the Roman name Britannia, possibly following the commentaries of Marinus of Tyre. He calls both Albion and Ierne νῆσοι Βρεττανικαὶ (nēsoi Brettanikai, "British Isles").

In 930, the English king Æthelstan used the title Rex et primicerius totius Albionis regni ("King and chief of the whole realm of Albion"). His nephew, Edgar the Peaceful, styled himself Totius Albionis imperator augustus "Augustus Emperor of all Albion" in 970.

The giants of Albion

A legend exists in various forms that giants were either the original inhabitants, or the founders of the land named Albion.

Geoffrey of Monmouth
According to the 12th-century Historia Regum Britanniae ("The History of The Kings of Britain") by Geoffrey of Monmouth, the exiled Brutus of Troy was told by the goddess Diana:

After many adventures, Brutus and his fellow Trojans escape from Gaul and "set sail with a fair wind towards the promised island".

"The island was then called Albion, and inhabited by none but a few giants. Notwithstanding this, the pleasant situation of the places, the plenty of rivers abounding with fish, and the engaging prospect of its woods, made Brutus and his company very desirous to fix their habitation in it." After dividing up the island between themselves "at last Brutus called the island after his own name Britain, and his companions Britons; for by these means he desired to perpetuate the memory of his name". Geoffrey goes on to recount how the last of the giants are defeated, the largest one called Goëmagot is flung over a cliff by Corineus.

Anglo-Norman Albina story
Later, in the 14th century, a more elaborate tale was developed, claiming that Albina and her sisters founded Albion and procreated there a race of giants. The "Albina story" survives in several forms, including the octosyllabic Anglo-Norman poem "Des grantz geanz" dating to 1300–1334. According to the poem, in the 3970th year of the creation of the world, a king of Greece married his thirty daughters into royalty, but the haughty brides colluded to eliminate their husbands so they would be subservient to no one. The youngest would not be party to the crime and divulged the plot, so the other princesses were confined to an unsteerable rudderless ship and set adrift, and after three days reached an uninhabited land later to be known as "Britain". The eldest daughter Albina was the first to step ashore and lay claim to the land, naming it after herself. At first, the women gathered acorns and fruits, but once they learned to hunt and obtain meat, it aroused their lecherous desires. As no other humans inhabited the land, they mated with evil spirits called "incubi", and subsequently with the sons they begot, engendering a race of giants. These giants are evidenced by huge bones which are unearthed. Brutus arrived 260 years after Albina, 1136 before the birth of Christ, but by then there were only 24 giants left, due to inner strife. As with Geoffrey of Monmouth's version, Brutus's band subsequently overtake the land, defeating Gogmagog in the process.

Manuscripts and forms
The octosyllabic poem appears as a prologue to 16 out of 26 manuscripts of the Short Version of the Anglo-Norman prose Brut, which derives from Wace. Octosyllabic is not the only form the Anglo-Norman Des Grantz Geanz, there are five forms, the others being: the alexandrine, prose, short verse, and short prose versions. The Latin adaptation of the Albina story, De Origine Gigantum, appeared soon later, in the 1330s. It has been edited by Carey & Crick (1995), and translated by Ruth Evans (1998).

Diocletian's daughters
A variant tale occurs in the Middle English prose Brut (Brie ed., The Brut or the Chronicles of England 1906–1908) of the 14th century, an English rendition of the Anglo-Norman Brut deriving from Wace. In the Prolog of this chronicle, it was King "Dioclician" of "Surrey" (Syria), who had 33 daughters, the eldest being called "Albyne". The princesses are all banished to Albion after plotting to murder their husbands, where they couple with the local demons; their offspring became a race of giants. The chronicle asserts that during the voyage Albyne entrusted the fate of the sisters to "Appolyn," which was the god of their faith. The Syrian king who was her father sounds much like a Roman emperor, though Diocletian (3rd century) would be anachronistic, and Holinshed explains this as a bungling of the legend of Danaus and his fifty daughters who founded Argos.

Later treatment of the myth
Because Geoffrey of Monmouth's work was regarded as fact until the late 17th century, the story appears in most early histories of Britain. Wace, Layamon, Raphael Holinshed, William Camden and John Milton repeat the legend and it appears in Edmund Spenser's The Faerie Queene.

William Blake's poems Milton and Jerusalem feature Albion as an archetypal giant representing humanity.

In 2010, artist Mark Sheeky donated the 2008 painting "Two Roman Legionaries Discovering The God-King Albion Turned Into Stone" to the Grosvenor Museum collection.

See also

 
 Clas Myrddin, an early name for Great Britain given in the Third Series of Welsh Triads.
 
 Nordalbingia, based on the Latin name for the Elbe River: Alba

Notes

References

Bibliography

Albina story

Studies

History of the British Isles
Terminology of the British Isles